Clonk is a single player and multiplayer video game series. The games feature a mix of the action, real-time strategy and platform game genres. Developed between 1994 and 2014 by RedWolf Design, the games of the series were originally released as shareware and became freeware and later open source software around 2008 and 2014. The game's community has since developed the series under the name OpenClonk. The series was compared and described as a mixture of Worms, The Settlers, Tetris, Lemmings and Minecraft. The game was noted for the easy game "extension" mechanic with an integrated editor and developer mode, which allows experienced players to create their own modifications directly into the game.

Gameplay 
In Clonk, the player controls small, humanoid beings - the so-called Clonks - within a two-dimensional, dynamically modifiable landscape using keyboard or mouse. Clonks interact with their surrounding landscape, animals, weather, buildings and objects. The game can be played alone or in multiplayer in split-screen or via local network or Internet. Four different keyboard settings, combined with the option of using a mouse or gamepad, result in allowing up to six players on one computer. The game goal depends on the scenario being played, varying between melees, in which players fight each other, strategical team siege scenarios and cooperative missions.

Extensions 
The expandability of the games is a core gameplay aspect and feature of the Clonk series. Several extensions were made over the years and offered for the registered users of the game. There are medieval (Knights), futuristic (Hazard), fantasy and "Cowboys and Indians" (Western) themed packs available. An elaborated scenario extension is Far worlds which features the deep sea, jungle and Arctic. The Western object pack was originally created for a design contest, but has been developed into an official extension.

Community made extensions 
Additionally, many unofficial extensions have been created by players. One example is the modern military-combat extension called "Codename: Modern Combat", which includes various weapons, vehicles, and scenarios in a modern-combat setting.

Since the release of Clonk Planet, players may start a development of their own extension by using the integrated developer mode. It is possible to add new objects (such as Clonks, weapons, buildings, etc.), scenarios or complete packs such as the official Extensions. Many players have used these options and created extension packs, which can be downloaded from the fan sites.

The Comprehensive Clonk Archive Network (CCAN) is one of central hubs for the Clonk community to share self-made extensions for the game. Extensions for older (freeware) versions of Clonk can be downloaded there.

History

Between 1994 and 1996 RedWolf Design, with the German lead developer Matthes Bender, created four Clonk games for the MS-DOS/PC platform. The games of the series were released and commercialized as Shareware.

In 1999 RedWolf released their first Windows Clonk game, Clonk 4 (in retail release under the name Clonk World).

Starting from 2001, RedWolf Design stopped development of the 2D engine based Clonk Planet and started developing Clonk Extreme with the Torque Game Engine. "Clonk Extreme" - short "ClonkX" - was supposed to transform the game principle of Clonk into a 3D-game. It is also the first game title that doesn't support the digging mechanic. On the development end of Clonk Planet, the source code of its 2D engine was released, which attracted a team of players who developed Clonk Planet: Golden Wipf Edition - short GWE. Within this fan-project, several sorely missed features have been implemented, such as more editability and modern 32-bit color graphics.

Revival of the series 
In 2003, RedWolf Design revived the series' 2D branch by collaborating with the GWE team and derived the next official Clonk title called Clonk Endeavour from the previous GWE 4. Clonk Endeavour received positive attention when it was presented on the Games Convention in Leipzig, and won a newcomer contest held by GIGA TV. The game was sold in the CD version for €25 and as digital download for €15.

The development continued, and several extensions such as a new network architecture for faster internet games and a fullscreen menu system were being developed. The development led to a new sequel, Clonk Rage, which became the officially current version on May 5, 2008. Its predecessor, Clonk Endeavour, was released as freeware a couple of days later. 

The other 3D development branch, Clonk Extreme, progressed slowly, and in 2008 only early alpha versions, some screenshots and one preview video of the game were available. Clonk Extreme was announced with a release date in 2050, but this was later found to be an April Fools' Day joke. However, in 2009 RedWolf Design's leader Matthes Bender announced he would be working on other projects, and the Clonk Extreme development was frozen without probable continuing development.

Development of Clonk Rage continued until May 2014. In 2014 the forums of Clonk were closed, and on end-of-support of all available Clonk versions, their engine source and game content have been released under open-source licenses to the community.

Specifically, Clonk 1 to 3 Borland Turbo C++ code, Clonk Planet v4.65 and Clonk Endeavour v4.95.5 (engines only) VC6 code and Clonk Rages current development prototype were released under the Clonk Source Code License (ISC License).

The content of all the games in the series was released under the CC BY-NC Creative Commons license, making them freely shareable and downloadable freeware.

OpenClonk Community continuation 

OpenClonk is an open source continuation based on Clonk Rage by a community of Clonk enthusiasts and former Clonk developers. It is not officially developed by RedWolf Design. 

OpenClonk is licensed under the ISC license with the content under CC BY-SA (or more permissive).

OpenClonk is the first Clonk game not to support backwards compatibility for previous expansion packs. Since the requirement for backwards compatibility has been dropped, many new features have been implemented into OpenClonk. These include 3D graphics, traditional run and gun controls, a zooming camera, and a completely redesigned base objects pack. Though OpenClonk supports 3D graphics, the game world remains a 2D platformer. Development happens on a git repository and, as of March 2017, is active with regularly releases and nightly builds.

Reception 
In 2004 Clonk Endeavour attracted some attention when it was presented on the Games Convention in Leipzig and won a newcomer contest held by GIGA TV.

In 2007 German computer magazine Computer Bild lists Clonk Planet with 4/5 stars. German gaming website gbase.de reviewed Clonk Rage in 2009 and gave it 7.5/10 points.

A Russian game magazine's review called Clonk Planet "a plotless masterpiece" comparable with Tetris and Lemmings.

The game was reviewed by several other German game magazines.

See also 
 OpenClonk

References

External links 
 http://www.clonk.de/?lng=en - official English site (Redwolf Design)
 http://www.openclonk.org/ - official website of OpenClonk
 https://github.com/openclonk/openclonk - OpenClonk GitHub code mirror
 http://www.ccan.de/ - database of game extensions created by players
 https://archive.today/20121231073608/http://www.clonkforge.net/ -sSite used to organize development teams for Clonk extensions

1994 video games
Strategy video games
Platform games
DOS games
Windows games
Linux games
Multiplayer and single-player video games
Open-source video games
Freeware games
Commercial video games with freely available source code
Creative Commons-licensed video games
Video games developed in Germany